iWantTFC is a Philippine over-the-top content streaming video on demand service owned and operated by ABS-CBN. It offers original series and movies, exclusive on-demand content based on ABS-CBN's entertainment productions, content from ABS-CBN's library, and live streams of ABS-CBN's broadcast properties.

Original programming

Drama

Comedy

Docuseries

Reality/unscripted

Animation

Original films

Live programming

Channels

Current 

 A8 ESports
 ABS-CBN News Channel
 Black Belt TV
 Cine Mo!
 Cinema One
 FashionTV
 Kapamilya Channel
 Knowledge Channel
 MOR Entertainment
 Myx America
 Myx Philippines
 Scream Flix
 TeleRadyo
 The Filipino Channel
 Toro TV
 UAAP Varsity Channel

Former 
 ABS-CBN
 ABS-CBN Regional Channel
 O Shopping
 S+A

Available only on iWant TV (2010–2018) 

 Al Jazeera
 Asian Food Channel
 AXN
 Basketball TV
 Bloomberg Television
 Cartoon Network
 CNN
 Colours
 E!
 Food Network
 FYI
 History
 HITS
 Jack TV
 KIX
 Lifetime
 Living Asia Channel
 MOR 101.9 Manila
 National Geographic Channel
 Nickelodeon
 RTL CBS Entertainment
 Solar Sports
 WarnerTV
 Thrill
 Toonami
 Travel Channel

Shows

Specials

Exclusive distributions

Filipino dubbed series

Non-Filipino dubbed series

Concerts

Acquired films

Notes

References

iWant
iWant
ABS-CBN Digital Media